Wolfgang Heinrich Johannes Fuchs (May 19, 1915, Munich – February 24, 1997) was a British mathematician specializing in complex analysis. His main area of research was Nevanlinna theory.

Fuchs received his Ph.D. in 1941 from the University of Cambridge, under the direction of Albert Ingham. He joined the faculty of Cornell University in 1950 and spent the rest of his career there.

See also
 Erdős–Fuchs theorem
 Chung–Fuchs theorem

References

External links
 

20th-century German mathematicians
Mathematical analysts
Alumni of the University of Cambridge
Cornell University faculty
Scientists from Munich
1915 births
1997 deaths
German emigrants to the United Kingdom